King Leonardo and His Short Subjects (also known as The King and Odie Show) is a 1960–1963 American Saturday-morning animated television series that aired on NBC, sponsored by General Mills. It was created by Total Television (which would later rename itself Leonardo Productions after the main character) and is among the first Saturday-morning cartoon programs.

Plot
The show focuses on Leonardo the lion (voiced by Jackson Beck), the well-meaning but often inept king of Bongo Congo, a fictional African nation notable for its bongos. King Leonardo is assisted in all things by a calm, competent skunk named Odie Cologne or "Odie O. Cologne" (voiced by Allen Swift impersonating Ronald Colman). Odie, the one who really keeps the kingdom on an even keel, has been by the king's side since they were children.

King Leonardo's main archenemy is the gangster-type character Biggie Rat (voiced by Jackson Beck impersonating Edward G. Robinson), who routinely attempts to overthrow Leonardo and take over Bongo Congo for himself, with Leonardo's dimwitted sibling Itchy Brother (voiced by Allen Swift) being his puppet king. Biggie is often also assisted by an evil German inventor named Professor Messer (voiced by Jackson Beck) or Odie's flirtatious sister Carlotta. Biggie and Itchy's schemes always end with them either landing in the dungeon or escaping.

Episodes of The King and Odie that were exclusive to Tennessee Tuxedo and His Tales feature Biggie Rat and Itchy Brother employed by Mr. Mad (voiced by Norman Rose), a mad scientist with a domineering personality. Mr. Mad has his own plans for Bongo Congo and indulges in his diabolical studies of behavior where he collected different types of people while lacking a King for his studies. Mr. Mad also threatened to throw Biggie and Itchy in "The Room" which contains unseen stuff that frightens both of them should they fail him. When his schemes fail, Mr. Mad disappears "as if by magic" before he can be apprehended.

Other segments
Each half-hour episode of King Leonardo consisted of five animated segments. Each half-hour included a two-part King and Odie episode, with other characters featured in between:

 Tooter Turtle: The adventures of a turtle (voiced by Allen Swift) who has Mr. Wizard the Lizard (voiced by Sandy Becker) transport him to various settings, only to realize he was better off at home after all. When Tooter was trapped in a situation he couldn't get out of, he would call to the wizard, who sent him home with this incantation: "Drizzle drazzle druzzle drome, time for this one to come home."
 The Hunter: A Southern-accented, crime-fighting bloodhound detective (voiced by Kenny Delmar, reprising his Senator Claghorn voice from The Fred Allen Show) chases after a criminal fox named The Fox (voiced by Ben Stone). The Fox would often commit a scheme which always ends with him being apprehended in the end.

Another segment of the original King Leonardo show was Twinkles, an orange elephant who served as the mascot of Twinkles Cereal, a product of the show's chief sponsor, General Mills. The 90-second Twinkles segments continued to air in syndication during the 1960s, and were presented in a 15-minute format under the title The King and Odie with George S. Irving narrating each segment. It later phased out after a firefighter character replaced the elephant as the cereal's mascot. The segments also appeared during some NBC network rebroadcasts of Underdog. The Twinkles segments were not included when King Leonardo And His Short Subjects was syndicated in a half-hour format during the 1980s.

Early in the series' NBC run, selected Columbia Pictures theatrical cartoons were aired on the program, some featuring The Fox and the Crow and Li'l Abner.

These shorts were added to fill time when production of the early shows was delayed. The Columbia cartoons were featured during NBC showings of Hanna-Barbera's Ruff and Reddy, but not included in subsequent syndicated versions of the series.

The animation for the show's early segments was produced by TV Spots, with later episodes by Gamma Productions, the same Mexico-based studio that did much of the work for Jay Ward Productions. For this reason, and due to shared sponsorship by General Mills, Gamma has often been associated with both Total Television Productions and Jay Ward Productions. TV Spots was primarily a producer of animated commercials, but also was contracted for some segments of Rocky and His Friends for Jay Ward Productions.

Later appearances
After King Leonardo and his Short Subjects ended, one season of new segments of "The King and Odie" and "The Hunter" continued to be produced and aired on Total TV's Tennessee Tuxedo and His Tales, which premiered in 1963. The following year, Total TV launched its most popular series, Underdog. When Underdog premiered in 1964, it featured repeats of The Hunter, while The Hunter's former spot on the Tennessee Tuxedo program was filled by repeats of Tooter Turtle.

In reruns, Total Television shorts often have been packaged alongside Jay Ward cartoons. Despite similar limited-animation styles, they were two separate studios.  The animation for both studios was done by a small startup company called Gamma Productions; hence, the similar "look."

King Leonardo, despite its earlier episodes repackaged for syndication as The King and Odie during the mid-1960s, never attained the popularity of Total Television's other series, Underdog and Tennessee Tuxedo, and is rarely seen on television today. Beginning in 2006, the Black Family Channel aired this show on its BFC Kids TV programming block until the channel's demise a year later. The characters of this show were also featured in an eight-issue comic book produced by Dell Comics and Gold Key.

Episodes

Cast
 Jackson Beck – King Leonardo, Biggie Rat, Professor Messer
 Allen Swift – Odie Cologne, Itchy Brother, Duke, Earl, Tooter Turtle, Narrator ("The King and Odie")
 Sandy Becker – Mr. Wizard
 Kenny Delmar – The Hunter, Narrator ("The Hunter")
 Ben Stone – The Fox, Officer Flim Flanigan
 Norman Rose – Mr. Mad, Narrator (several 1962 episodes of "The King and Odie")
 Delo States – various female and children's voices
 George S. Irving – Narrator ("Twinkles"), various voices

References

External links
 King Leonardo at Big Cartoon Database
 King Leonardo at Don Markstein's Toonopedia
 

1960s American animated television series
1960 American television series debuts
1963 American television series endings
English-language television shows
General Mills
NBC original programming
Total Television
Animated characters
American children's animated comedy television series
Animated television series about lions